Yema is a French watchmaking company that was founded and based in Besançon, France.

History

1948 - Founding and Henry Louis Belmont 
Henry Louis Belmont, a student of the National Watchmaking School of Besançon and major of his promotion in 1931, created 1948 his own watchmaking company under the name Yema.

1963 - Yema Superman collection 
In 1963, the company launched their very first Yema Superman for divers. Many variations were produced by the company for this model of watch.

1966 - Yema Yachtingraf collection and Yema RallyGraf collection 
In 1966, the first Yema Yachtingraf was launched, a watch especially designed for sailors. At the same time, the first Yema RallyGraf was launched. One Yema RallyGraf was even worn by Formula One Champion Mario Andretti.

At the start of 1970, Yema became an official supplier of the French Sailing Federation (Fédération Française de Yachting à Voile) and equipped the French National team who participated in the 1972 Olympic Games.

Six different versions of Yema Yachtingraf model were crafted over the years.

1982 - First French Watch in Space 
On 24 June 1982, for the first time, a French astronaut, Jean-Loup Chrétien, flew from the Baikonour base for a 10-day trip into space, wearing a Yema Spationaute I.

On 17 June 1985, the Discovery shuttle took off with Patrick Baudry and his Yema Spationaute II on mission STS-51G (First Franco-American Orbital Flight).

On 26 November 1988, Jean Loup Chrétien went on a mission to MIR Space Station wearing a Yema Spationaute III.

1986 - North Pole Mission 
In May 1986, Yema joined forces with French physician and explorer Jean-Louis Etienne to cross the North Pole.

1988 - Yema gets acquired by Seiko 
In 1988, Yema was bought by Seiko Watch Corporation of Japan.

2004 - Yema gets acquired again 
Later in 2004, Louis Eric Beckensteiner bought Yema.

2009 - Innovative watch movement and Yema gets acquired yet again 
Yema designed a new proprietary watch movement: the MBP 1000. Equipped with a bidirectional oscillating mass mounted on ball bearings, they allowed a fast reassembly and a power reserve of 40 hours. This resulted in a gain of efficiency but also precision, provided by a regulator whose balance beats at a frequency of 28,800 alternations per hour. Stacking a total of 31 rubies including 2 located at the ends of the axis of the barrel, this technical design effectively reduced the friction generally observed at this element following the mechanical movements.Also, Yema was acquired by the French watchmaker group Montres Ambre, which was based in Morteau.

2017 - Proxima Mission 
The mission which the 10th French astronaut went into the space was called Proxima, in tribute to the nearest star from the sun, which continues the French tradition of naming the missions after a star or a constellation. In 2017, Yema and CNES (the French Space Agency) worked together to create a new model in honour of this space mission, the Yema Spacegraf.

References

External links 
 Yema official website (English) 
 Page commemorating the 60 Years of Yema (French)
 Press article (Le Monde) commemorating the 60th Yema anniversary (French)
 Opinion article on Yema's history and 2017 new collection (French)
 Overview of sailing regatta watches: Yema Yachtingraf (English)
 Yema Yachtingraf - The Compendium (English)
 The history of Yema explained by a vintage watches amateur (French) 
 Yema's history on Watch-Wiki (German)



Watch brands
Watch manufacturing companies of France
Design companies established in 1948
French brands
Manufacturing companies established in 1948
French companies established in 1948